Visa requirements for Bahraini citizens are administrative entry restrictions by the authorities of other states placed on citizens of Bahrain. As of 13 April 2021, Bahraini citizens had visa-free or visa on arrival access to 83 countries and territories, ranking the Bahraini passport 64th in terms of travel freedom according to the Henley Passport Index.

Bahraini citizens do not need a visa to enter other member states  the GCC.

Visa requirements map

Visa requirements

Dependent, disputed, or restricted territories
Visa requirements for Bahraini citizens for visits to various territories, disputed areas, partially recognized countries and restricted zones:

Non-visa restrictions

See also

Visa policy of Bahrain
Bahraini passport

References and notes
References

Notes

Bahrain
Foreign relations of Bahrain